Guy Louis Gabaldon (March 22, 1926 – August 31, 2006) was a United States Marine who, at age 18, captured or persuaded to surrender over 1,300 Japanese soldiers and civilians during the battles for Saipan and Tinian islands in 1944 during World War II. Though Gabaldon was recommended for the Medal of Honor, he received the Silver Star, which was upgraded by the Marine Corps to the Navy Cross in 1960.

In 1960, a friend of Gabaldon's with Hollywood connections influenced the industry to make a movie about Gabaldon's version of events on Saipan called Hell to Eternity. He was called  'Gabby' by his friends, but he became known as "The Pied Piper of Saipan" for his heroism on that island. In 1964, he unsuccessfully ran for US Congressman in his Southern California district. In 1990, he authored a book entitled, Saipan: Suicide Island.

Early years
Gabaldon was born in Los Angeles, California. Gabaldon, who was of Mexican descent, was one of seven children. He was raised in East Los Angeles and, as a ten-year-old, he helped his family by shining shoes on Skid Row. Gabaldon became a member of a multi-ethnic gang known as the "Moe Gang". At age 12, he moved out of his home to live with the Nakano family, who were of Japanese heritage and whom he considered his extended family. He attended language school every day with their children and learned to speak Japanese. He also learned about their customs and culture.

World War II
At the outbreak of World War II the Nakanos, his "adopted" family, were sent to a relocation camp named the Heart Mountain Relocation Center, in Wyoming. He traveled to Alaska to work in a cannery. On March 22, 1943, Gabaldon's 17th birthday, he joined the United States Marine Corps. He received his basic training at Camp Pendleton, completed the Enlisted Marine Japanese Language School at Camp Elliot in San Diego, and was assigned to Headquarters and Service Company, 2nd Marine Regiment, 2nd Marine Division, as a scout and observer.

The Pied Piper of Saipan
The capture of Saipan was considered essential for the establishment of airfields which would accommodate the B-29 Superfortress bombers to be used in what was then the planned full-scale invasion of the Japanese mainland. On June 15, 1944, an armada of 535 ships, carrying 127,570 U.S. military personnel which included Marines from the 2nd and 4th Marine Divisions, began the invasion of Saipan. Japanese soldiers seldom surrendered during World War II and, as the American military invasion went badly for the Japanese, they were ordered by their superiors on Saipan to kill seven American Marines or soldiers for every soldier they lost, or commit suicide.

According to Gabaldon, he began taking and bringing in prisoners the night of the first day that he arrived on Saipan. According to Gabaldon:

Gabaldon was reprimanded by his superior officers, and threatened with a court-martial for leaving his post. However, according to him the next night he went out and did it again. He carefully approached a cave, shot the enemy guards outside, moved off to one side of the cave, and yelled in Japanese, "You're surrounded and have no choice but to surrender. Come out, and you will not be killed! I assure you will be well-treated. We do not want to kill you!"

The next morning he says he returned with 50 Japanese prisoners. As a result, Gabaldon was permitted by his commanding officer to act as a "lone wolf" operator.

The next day, on July 8, Gabaldon captured two more enemy guards. He convinced one of them to return to his cave, with an offering of surrender. Shortly thereafter, a Japanese officer showed up. After speaking to Gabaldon, the officer accepted the conditions of surrender—and over eight hundred Japanese soldiers and civilians surrendered to Gabaldon, who turned them over to the U.S. military authorities. For his exploits, according to Gabaldon, he became known as The Pied Piper of Saipan.

Contrary opinions on Gabaldon's actions on Saipan
In the book, One Marine's War: A Combat Interpreter's Quest for Mercy in the Pacific by Gerald A. Meehl, about USMC Japanese Language Officer Lt. Robert B. Sheeks, who also served on Saipan, Gabaldon is described by Sheeks as a relentless self-promoter who grossly exaggerated his exploits on Saipan and Tinian and that most of the Japanese he captured were civilians, not soldiers as he claimed.  The book states that the number of Japanese captured by Gabaldon was likely about half of the 1,500 that he claimed.  A total of 15,000 Japanese military and civilians and Pacific Islanders were captured or detained by the US during and after the battle.  Many others besides Gabaldon were involved in those efforts, but according to Sheeks, Gabaldon minimized the involvement of others when talking about his exploits during and after the battle.

Author Gerald A. Meehl in interviews with Saipan veterans and in other records, found reports of abusive behavior by Gabaldon towards Japanese civilians and soldiers he encountered on Saipan.  In one instance, witnessed by Sheeks, Gabaldon struck and broke the jaw of an elderly Japanese civilian who did not answer one of Gabaldon's questions quickly enough.

Tinian
Gabaldon continued to capture more Japanese people on Tinian. While back on Saipan fighting Japanese guerrillas still on the island, he was seriously wounded in an enemy machine gun ambush. Gabaldon claimed he was credited with the capture of approximately 1,500 Japanese soldiers and civilians on Saipan and Tinian and was recommended for the Medal of Honor by his commanding officer Captain John Schwabe, who noted that Gabaldon single-handedly captured more than ten times the number of prisoners taken by legendary Medal of Honor recipient, Sgt. Alvin C. York, in World War I. Despite this recommendation, Gabaldon was awarded a Silver Star Medal.

Post-war
Gabaldon received an honorable discharge from the Marine Corps as a result of his combat wounds. In 1960, the Marine Corps elevated his Silver Star Medal to the Navy Cross, the second highest US military decoration for valor.

After returning to civilian life, he moved to Mexico and ventured into various businesses such as a furniture store, fishing, and the import-export of Mexican goods. When his first marriage to June Gabaldon ended in divorce, he met the woman who became his second wife, Ohana Suzuki, while working in Mexico.

Gabaldon's World War II exploits became public when in 1957, he was the invited guest of This Is Your Life, a popular television program aired by NBC in the 1950s. Hosted by Ralph Edwards, the show presented the life stories of entertainment personalities and "ordinary" people who had contributed in some way to society. Later, Gabaldon appeared as himself on the September 1, 1960 episode of the CBS game show To Tell the Truth.

The fact that Gabaldon captured at least 1,500 Japanese prisoners was verified on the national program by Marines Corps intelligence officers Colonel Walter Layer, Colonel John Schwabe, Major James High, and several enlisted men from military intelligence.

Hollywood producers became interested in Gabaldon's story and in 1960 released the film Hell to Eternity where his actions on Saipan were memorialized. He was portrayed by actors Jeffrey Hunter as an adult and by Richard Eyer as a boy. Gabaldon himself served as an adviser in the filming of the movie.

Later years

In 1964, Gabaldon unsuccessfully ran for the United States Congress as a Republican in California.

In 1970, he moved to Saipan with his wife where he established a seafood business and ran a youth camp. He lived there for 20 years. He was an avid pilot and flew small planes all over the CNMI.

In 1990, he authored and self-published a book; Saipan: Suicide Island, also re-printed as America Betrayed. 

In 1995, he returned to California.

In 2003, he moved to Old Town, Florida.

In September 2004, Gabaldon was honored by the Pentagon, in a ceremony which recognized the contributions of Hispanic American World War II veterans.

Various organizations have requested the Medal of Honor for Gabaldon, but their requests have been rejected. After lobbying by the Hispanic community, the case to upgrade his Navy Cross to the Medal of Honor is currently under review by the Department of Defense.

Death
On August 31, 2006, Gabaldon died in Old Town, Florida, of heart disease. He was buried with full military honors at Arlington National Cemetery. Gabaldon is survived by his wife, Ohana; his sons Guy Jr., Ray, Tony, Yoshio, Jeffrey and Russell; his daughters Aiko, Hanako and Manya. Two members of his "adopted" family were actor Lane Nakano and his twin Lyle.

Awards and recognitions

During his lifetime, Gabaldon received many awards and recognitions, including resolutions honoring him from the City of Los Angeles, the City of Chicago, and the Commonwealth of Northern Marianas.

On November 12, 2005, he was the recipient of the Chesty Puller Award from the World War II Veterans Committee, a prominent organization which showcases the veterans of World War II and their history.

On July 7, 2006, he was honored by Mayor Antonio Villaraigosa of Los Angeles and the Los Angeles City Council. The Mayor and the city council sent a resolution to the White House requesting the Medal of Honor for Gabaldon. That same year the World War II Veteran's Committee in Washington, D.C., featured Gabaldon on the cover of their quarterly magazine. Also in July, Gabaldon was honored by the National Council of La Raza, a national organization and a leading Latino civil rights advocate.

In addition to the Hollywood movie Hell to Eternity, which recounted Gabaldon's heroism during World War II, Hollywood producer Steve Rubin made a 2008 documentary film about Gabaldon titled East L.A. Marine: The Untold True Story of Guy Gabaldon. Military artist Henry Godines also unveiled a commissioned portrait, titled The Pied Piper of Saipan, Guy Gabaldon.

Navy Cross citation

Military awards and decorations
Gabaldon's military awards include:

See also
 Hispanic Americans in World War II
 List of historic United States Marines
 Hispanics in the United States Marine Corps

Notes

References

External links
   
 "East L.A. Marine– Full Movie"
 Guy Gabaldon's Website.  
 Get Guy Gabaldon the Medal of Honor 
 Film-Forward review of East L.A. Marine – Documentary on Gabaldon's life
 

 Hell to Eternity on Internet Movie Database. 
 Medal of Honor Nominees on Film
. Resolution supporting the awarding of the Medal of Honor to Guy Gabaldo

1926 births
2006 deaths
United States Marine Corps personnel of World War II
American people of Mexican descent
Burials at Arlington National Cemetery
History of the Northern Mariana Islands
People from Los Angeles
Recipients of the Navy Cross (United States)
Recipients of the Silver Star
United States Marine Corps non-commissioned officers
People from Dixie County, Florida